Thy Neighbor's Wife is a non-fiction book by Gay Talese, published in 1981 and updated in 2009.

The book is an exploration of sexuality in America from after World War II through the 1970s, with notable discussion of the free love subculture. It provides a snapshot of liberated pre-AIDS sexual morality.

In preparation for writing the book, Talese resided for several months at clothing-optional resort Sandstone Retreat.

In 1979, prior to the book's publication, United Artists purchased the film rights to Thy Neighbor's Wife for $2.5 million, which at the time was the largest amount ever paid for film rights to any book. At the time, UA contemplated making as many as three films based on the book, and in 1980, William Friedkin agreed to write and direct the first film, which he contemplated would receive an X rating. However, as of 2023, no film has been made.

References

External links
 The Life and Loves of Gay Talese: discussion of the work and its author from ABC News.

1981 non-fiction books
Works by Gay Talese
Non-fiction books about sexuality
Doubleday (publisher) books
English-language books